Sibřina is a municipality and village in Prague-East District in the Central Bohemian Region of the Czech Republic. It has about 900 inhabitants.

Administrative parts
The village of Stupice is an administrative part of Sibřina.

References

Villages in Prague-East District